Ottenby is a nature reserve on the Swedish island Öland. It is one of Sweden's largest and most famous places for birdwatchers. The bird watch station Ottenby fågelstation was founded in 1946 together with the Sveriges Ornitologiska Förening. the ringing of birds is one of the main tasks of Ottenby fågelstation.

The goal of the ringing is to view migration routes of birds. Also the spreading of the Avian influenza is viewed at the station.

References 

Nature reserves in Sweden
Öland